Qayamat is a 2021 Pakistani television series, directed by Ali Faizan Anchan and written by Sarwat Nazir for 7th Sky Entertainment owned by Abdullah Kadwani and Asad Qureshi. It premiered on 5 January 2021 on Geo TV, every Tuesday and Wednesday.

Plot 
"Qayamat is a story of a young and beautiful girl whose life decisions are dominated by those around her. Eventually, all hell breaks loose when the people closest to her repeatedly make the same mistake making her future bleak. 

Ifrah along with her parents and elder sister Samra belongs to the lower middle class and believes in hard work and honesty. Samrah is in love with her friend's brother Saad. Their marriage has also been fixed. But, on informing their wealthy uncle Mukhtar, he asks them to break off that marriage and to give Samrah hand for his son Rashid (no one is willing to marry Rashid as he not only failed in eighth grade, he doesn't have a great reputation). Ifrah and Samrah's parent first refuse Mukhtar, but he threatens them and tells them that he will take back their house and their shop (it is all in his name). On hearing this, Samrah, though reluctant, agrees to the wedding, willing to sacrifice her happiness for her family.

Meanwhile, Rashid's brother Jawad, comes back from Canada. He and Ifrah fall in love with each other, and their marriage is also fixed.

After their marriage, Samrah faces mistreatment from Rashid, and his mother Nargis (Nargis wanted a richer daughter-in-law). She gets pregnant, but their treatment towards her don't improve. One day, when Rashid and Samrah argue over his mistress Pari, he pushes her and she falls. She is rushed to the hospital, where she dies, after giving birth to their daughter, who is named Sana. While all this is happening, Rashid is spending time with his mistress Pari, whom he accidentally shoots while fighting over her with her other boyfriend.

Rashid's family decides to get him married to Ifrah. Ifrah disagrees. Jawad sees that his niece needs a mother and begs her to marry his brother. Jawad sacrifices his love and eventually, Ifrah agrees. Ifrah's parents repeat their mistake of marrying off their daughter to Rashid, who is known to have subjected their eldest daughter to frequent domestic abuse. Knowing the main culprit behind her sister's demise, Ifrah decides that if she's destined to marry Samra's abuser, then there must be vengeance.

Cast

Main cast
 Ahsan Khan as Rashid 
 Neelam Muneer as Ifrah
 Amar Khan as Samra; Ifrah's sister 
 Haroon Shahid as Jawad; Rashid's brother

Supporting cast
 Saba Faisal as Nargis; Rashid's mother
 Shabbir Jan as Mukhtar; Rashid's father
 Noor ul Hassan as Fayaz; Ifrah's father
 Kinza Malik as Afiyah; Ifrah's mother, 
 Zainab Qayyum as Nadra; Rashid's aunt & Nargis' sister

Recurring cast
 Sidra Niazi as Urooj, Nadra's niece
 Sana Fakhar as Pari; Rashid's girlfriend
 Mizna Waqas as Saira; Saad's sister
 Haris Waheed as Saad
 Mubasira Khanam as Saad / Saira's mother
 Afshan Qureshi as Pari's mother
 Faiza Gillani as Parween; Fayyaz's devious servant
 Zuhab Khan as Shahid; Parween's brother, disguised as her son
 Hareem Hammad as Sana; Rashid's daughter (child actress)
 Birjees Farooqui as Amma; A school's principle
 Salma Qadir as Aunt Batool; a matchmaker
 Sohail Masood as Uncle Shakirullah; Fayaz's friend
 Ayat Arif as Mariya; Urooj's daughter (child actress)

Production 
It marked fourth on-screen appearance of Ahsan Khan with Neelum Muneer after Kaise Huaye Benaam, Kaisi Khushi Le Ke Aya Chand and their 2017's hit film Chupan Chupai while Noor-ul-Hassan and Kinza Malik as their sixth on-screen together appearance on TV after Sammi, Alif Allah Aur Insaan, Dar Si Jaati Hai Sila, Lashkara and Inkaar.

References

External links 
 Qayamat on Har Pal Geo 
 Qayamat on 7th Sky Entertainment

Urdu-language television shows
Geo TV original programming
Pakistani drama television series
2021 Pakistani television series debuts